The 1939 German Grand Prix was a Grand Prix motor race held at the Nürburgring on 23 July 1939.

Classification

References

German Grand Prix
German Grand Prix
1939 in German motorsport